Taiwan Football Premier League (TFPL) is the top-ranked division in the Taiwanese football league run by Chinese Taipei Football Association (CTFA).

History

The Taiwan Football Premier League was founded in 2017 after the folding of the then highest-ranked National First Division Football League (Intercity Football League).

Under the serious epidemic COVID-19 in 2020, TFPL due to light situation in Taiwan, became one of the few football leagues in the world to start the season as usual.

Competition format 

The Taiwan Football Premier League's schedule usually runs from April to November. It contains 8 teams that compete in a series of three round-robin tournaments, each composed of seven games. After the 21 game schedule is complete, the top team wins the league title and an automatic berth in the following year's AFC Cup.

Since 2020, a system of promotion and relegation exists between the Premier League and the Taiwan Football Challenge League . The lowest placed team in the Premier League is relegated to the Challenge League, and the top team from the Challenge League promoted to the Premier League. The runners-up of the Challenge League will play in a qualification tournament with the 7th in the Premier League, which the winner stays in the first Division.

Teams

Former teams
 NSTC (國家儲訓) (2017-2018)
 Royal Blues (皇家蔚藍) (2017–2018)
 Land Home NTUS (璉紅臺體) (2017–2021)
 Flight Skywalkers (台北展逸天行者) (2018-2021) 
 CPC (台灣中油) (2021)

Timeline

Stadiums

Former stadiums

Champions

Awards

Best Player

Golden Boot

Golden Glove

Best Manager

Fair Play Award

See also

Intercity Football League
Enterprise Football League

References

 
2017 establishments in Taiwan
Football leagues in Taiwan
Professional sports leagues in Taiwan
Recurring events established in 2017
Taiwan